Pinardi is an Italian surname. Notable people with the surname include:

Alex Pinardi (born 1980), Italian footballer
Giovanni Battista Pinardi (1880–1962), Italian Roman Catholic prelate
Nadia Pinardi (born 1956), Italian oceanographer and academic
Umberto Pinardi (born 1928), Italian footballer and manager

Italian-language surnames